E. montanus may refer to:

Eleutherodactylus montanus, frog endemic to the Dominican Republic
Eremias montanus, lizard found in the Alvand Mountains in Hamadan Province, Iran
Euscorpiops montanus, scorpion native to Bhutan, India and Pakistan